Deon Lee Simon (born July 6, 1990) is a former American football nose tackle. He was drafted by the New York Jets in the seventh round of the 2015 NFL Draft. He played college football at Northwestern State.

Early years
Simon attended Glen Oaks High School, where he was named to the First-team All-District in his junior season.

College career
Simon was an All Southland Conference Honorable Mention in his junior season along with being named as an all-conference Honorable Mention. Prior to his senior season, he was named to the Southland Conference Preseason All-Conference first-team.

Professional career

New York Jets
Simon was drafted by the New York Jets in the seventh round (223rd overall) of the 2015 NFL Draft. He signed a four-year, $2.3 million contract on May 7, 2015.

Simon was released on September 30, 2015. The Jets re-signed Simon to the practice squad on October 1, 2015.

After a solid training camp and preseason, Simon made the 53-man roster for the 2016 season. He appeared in all 16 games of 2016, finishing with 23 tackles and 1.5 sacks.

On September 2, 2017, Simon was waived by the Jets and was signed to the practice squad the next day. He was promoted to the active roster on December 27, 2017.

On September 1, 2018, Simon was waived by the Jets.

Tennessee Titans
On September 3, 2018, Simon was signed to the Tennessee Titans' practice squad. He was released on September 25, 2018.

Green Bay Packers
On September 29, 2018, Simon was signed to the Green Bay Packers' practice squad. He signed a reserve/future contract with the Packers on December 31, 2018. He was released on August 31, 2019.

Dallas Renegades
On November 22, 2019, Simon was drafted by the Dallas Renegades in the 2020 XFL Supplemental Draft. He was waived during final roster cuts on January 22, 2020.

References

External links
Northwestern State bio

1990 births
Living people
Players of American football from Baton Rouge, Louisiana
American football defensive tackles
Northwestern State Demons football players
New York Jets players
Tennessee Titans players
Green Bay Packers players
Dallas Renegades players